KZKC-LD (channel 28) is a low-power television station in Bakersfield, California, United States. It is a translator of ABC affiliate KERO-TV (channel 23) which is owned by the E. W. Scripps Company. KZKC-LD's transmitter is located atop Breckenridge Mountain; its parent station maintains studios on 21st Street in Downtown Bakersfield.

History

The station was originally owned by Cocola Broadcasting, where it served as a repeater for Fresno's KMSG-LP (channel 43), an Azteca América affiliate; McGraw-Hill bought it in 2006 and made it a stand-alone station. McGraw-Hill announced on October 3, 2011, that it would sell KZKC-LP, along with its other television stations, to the E. W. Scripps Company as part of its exit from broadcasting. The deal was completed on December 30, 2011. KZKC-LP became an owned-and-operated station of the relaunched Court TV during 2019. Azteca América programming has moved to KBBV-CD (channel 19), and is also available via its national feed on satellite and IPTV providers.

KZKC-LP was converted to digital in 2020 as a translator of KERO-TV, allowing homes with issues receiving KERO-TV's VHF signal or only a UHF antenna to receive KERO-TV in some form.

Subchannels
The station's digital signal is multiplexed:

References

External links

Low-power television stations in the United States
ABC network affiliates
Court TV affiliates
ZKC-LD
E. W. Scripps Company television stations
Television channels and stations established in 1999
1999 establishments in California